The Australian occupation of German New Guinea was the takeover of the Pacific colony of German New Guinea in September – November 1914 by an expeditionary force from Australia, called the Australian Naval and Military Expeditionary Force.

Background

German New Guinea 

German New Guinea was an Imperial German protectorate from 1884. German New Guinea consisted of the territories of the northeastern part of New Guinea and the nearby Bismarck Archipelago, consisting of New Britain and New Ireland. Together with the other Western Pacific German islands, excluding German Samoa, they formed the Imperial German Pacific Protectorates. The protectorate included the German Solomon Islands, the Caroline Islands, Palau, the Mariana Islands (except for Guam), the Marshall Islands and Nauru. Imperial Germany had a paramilitary police force, the Polizeitruppe, in New Guinea; generally used to keep up order and put down rebellions. The Polizeitruppe at Bita Paka consisted of about 50 German officers, NCOs and reservists and 240 native police soldiers. Rabaul was well stocked with the coal for use by the German East Asian Cruiser Squadron.

Military situation 
Britain had already severed all German undersea cables passing through British controlled areas. Concerned about possible attacks against Allied merchant shipping in the region, Britain requested that Australia destroy the German wireless stations and coaling stations in the Pacific.

Australia hurriedly raised the Australian Naval & Military Expeditionary Force (ANMEF), consisting of one battalion of infantry of 1,000 men enlisted in Sydney, known as the 1st Battalion, ANMEF and 500 naval reservists and ex-sailors who would serve as infantry. Another battalion of militia from the Queensland based Kennedy Regiment, which had been hurriedly dispatched to garrison Thursday Island, also contributed 500 volunteers to the force. The ANMEF was tasked with the capture of the Imperial German Pacific Protectorates within six months. This included capturing or destroying the radio stations and coal stations supporting the German East Asia Squadron.

Under the command of Vice Admiral Sir George Patey, the destroyers entered Blanche Bay on 12 August. HMAS Australia captured Sumatra and HMAS Encounter captured Zambesi while patrolling St Georges Channel on 12 August. HMAS Melbourne requisitioned the cargo of coal of the collier Alconda off Rossel Island on 13 August.

The destroyers entered Simpson Harbour and Matupi Harbour at night searching for the German East Asia Squadron. Unable to locate the radio station, the Australian warships threatened to bombard nearby settlements if the radio station continued to transmit, before withdrawing.

Occupation

New Britain

Battle of Bita Paka 

The Battle of Bita Paka took place on 11 September, during an Australian attempt to capture the German wireless station. A mixed force of German officers and Melanesian police mounted a stout resistance and forced the Australians to fight their way to the objective. After a day of fighting in which both sides suffered casualties, the more numerous Australian forces finally succeeded in capturing and destroying the wireless station.

Siege of Toma 

The Siege of Toma took place between 14–17 September, when troops of the ANMEF surrounded Toma. They finally brought up a 12-pound field piece to bombard it, which caused the German garrison to negotiate a surrender.

New Guinea

Madang 
Madang was captured without opposition on 24 September.

Aftermath 
Organised and completed with remarkable speed, the occupation of German New Guinea was significant as the first independent military operation carried out by Australia.

Lieutenant Hermann Detzner, a German officer with some 20 native policemen, evaded capture in the interior of New Guinea and managed to remain free for the entire war. After the Treaty of Versailles of 1919, the victorious Allies divided all German's colonial possessions among themselves. German New Guinea became the Territory of New Guinea, a League of Nations Mandate Territory under Australian administration.

See also 
Australian occupation of German New Guinea order of battle

Notes

References

Further reading

German New Guinea
Conflicts in 1914
A
1914 in Australia
1914 in the German colonial empire
1914 in Papua New Guinea
Battles of World War I involving Australia
Battles of World War I involving Germany
September 1914 events
October 1914 events
November 1914 events
1910s in German New Guinea